Hadley Gamble (born Laura Gamble; September 10, 1981) is an American CNBC anchor based in Abu Dhabi.

Early life
Gamble attended Halls High School in Knox County, Tennessee.

Career
Hadley Gamble is CNBC's Anchor based in Abu Dhabi. Hadley anchors Capital Connection from CNBC's Middle East Headquarters based within Abu Dhabi Global Markets. The show, broadcast daily, gives you a reading on Asia's markets mid-day and sets you up for the Middle East and European trading day.

In addition, Hadley also fronts CNBC's popular feature franchise Access: Middle East where she speaks to world leaders, international CEOs and philanthropists.  Among the guests: King Abdullah II of Jordan, US Secretary of State Mike Pompeo, Blackrock CEO Larry Fink, Egyptian President Abdel Fattah el-Sisi, Facebook's Sean Parker, HRH Princess Reema bin Bandar Al-Saud and Bill Gates, as well as U.S. Treasury Secretary Steven Mnuchin and U.S. Secretary of Defense Mark Esper.

In October 2018, interviewed Saudi Foreign Minister Adel Al-Jubeir was the first comment from a Saudi official following Khashoggi's death.   She was also the first international journalist to be live on the ground at Aramco oil facilities in September 2019 reporting the damage left by Iranian rockets and drones.

Hadley regularly anchors for CNBC from the World Economic Forum in Davos, moderating panels on topics ranging from geopolitics to economics.

Hadley is also a passionate advocate for women.   She moderated the first ever women's business forum in Saudi Arabia and provided exclusive content to CNBC as the Kingdom lifted its decades-old driving ban.

Early career
Gamble worked for ABC News and Fox News in Washington, DC. Gamble presented CNBC's Access: Middle East and Access: Africa. Gamble has reported several times from the World Economic Forum in Davos.

Personal life 
Hadley is from Knoxville, Tennessee in the United States.  She is a cousin of famed interior designer Albert Hadley. She attended the University of Miami in Florida, and was a member of Delta Gamma sorority.

References

Living people
Place of birth missing (living people)
American expatriates in the United Arab Emirates
CNBC people
University of Miami alumni
Journalists from Tennessee
American television news anchors
American women television journalists
Halls High School (Knox County, Tennessee) alumni
1981 births
21st-century American women